Colotis ephyia is a butterfly in the family Pieridae. It is found in Chad, Sudan, south-western Saudi Arabia and Yemen.

References

Butterflies described in 1829
ephyia